Royal Feast (Chinese: 尚食; pinyin: Shàng Shí) is a historical costume drama series directed by Wang Wei and Bai Yunmo, starring Xu Kai, Wu Jinyan, Wang Churan, Wang Yizhe, Zhang Nan, He Fengtian, Liu Min, with He Ruixian, Wang Yan, and Lian Lian. The special stars Yu Rongguang, Hong Jiantao, Zhang Zhixi, Wang Yu, Deng Sha, and Cheng Lisha. The drama tells the inspirational emotional story of Yao Zijin, a girl who was selected as the maid of the Shangshi Bureau during the Yongle period of the Ming Dynasty. The drama was broadcast on Mango TV on February 22, 2022.

Synopsis 

Set during the Ming dynasty during the rule of the Emperor Yongle, the show tells the story of a young girl named Yao Zijin, who enters the palace to become a maid of the food bureau, rising through the ranks and encountering romantic entanglements along the way. When she gets the task of delivering meals for the Emperor’s grandson, Zhanji, they develop a connection. However, Zijin has a mysterious background which she wants to keep hidden, and her principles  make her hesitant to enter into a romantic relationship with Zhanji. The Food Bureau is part of a complex web of plots, ambitions and palace politics. When Zijin's background becomes known she becomes a target for those who feel threatened. Meanwhile, Zhanji has to protect his father and fend off moves by his uncles to grab the throne. From the twists and turns of the two people's emotional story, the drama shows the historical achievements and family life of the three outstanding emperors of the Ming Dynasty, and paints a picture of ancient cultural life full of strong family, friendship, love, and human touch. Revealing the true “food", that is, food is a bridge that promotes communication between people and different cultures, and Chinese food culture is one of the important cultural treasures that affects neighboring countries and the world.

Cast and Characters

Main Cast 

 Xu Kai as Zhu Zhanji

He has both civil and military skills, as well as wisdom and courage. He is especially good at poetry, calligraphy, painting, and playing the guqin. His character is a respectable, well-rounded man who is loved by the emperor and respected by the court and the public.

 Wu Jinyan as Yao Zijin

A well-born folk girl, when she was a teenager, she met Zhu Zhanji, who visited the farmhouse unannounced with Zhu Di. After entering the Shangshi Bureau, she began to understand the real way of drinking and writing, and met Zhu Zhanji.

Wang Churan as Su Yuehua

The cold and proud female official of the Shang Food Bureau, who came from a family of famous chefs; her biological mother left her without saying goodbye when she was a child, which brought her a lifetime of confusion. When she became an adult, she entered the palace in order to find her mother. Se is also quite tall, and competes with Zijin and Yin Ziping for the position of Shangshi in the Ming Dynasty.

 Wang Yizhe as You Yifan

The cynical guard, You Yifan is handsome, cruel, and rebellious. He was promoted because of his great success in rescue and driving. He became the youngest Jinyi guard commander in the Ming Dynasty. He acted both righteously and evilly. Fear, on the surface, he is friendly with Zhu Zhanji, but in fact hides many secrets.

 Zhang Nan as Hu Shanxiang

Zhu Zhanji's first queen. Her nature is virtuous, her demeanor is solemn, she is quite famous. In the name of Xian, the imperial concubine was born with auspiciousness and was chosen as the concubine. She has no children, because she only gave birth to two princesses, and she is not favored. She was ordered by Emperor Xuanzong to resign as Empress Hu on the grounds that Empress Hu had no children and was ill. She was deposed as a Taoist nun in Chang'an Palace and given the title of Immortal Master Jingci. On the first day of March of the same year, Xuanzong changed his concubine Sun as the empress.

 He Ruixian as Yin Ziping

The Yin family has been discriminated against from generation to generation since they were classified as beggar households from Zhang Shicheng's former clan during the Hongwu period. She never admits defeat, learns the art of cooking and uses all her powers to enter the palace under false pretences, trying to compete for the position of Shangshi in the Ming Dynasty, and completely change her destiny. From a humble background, she yearns for fame and status most in her life. With her cooking skills and deep scheming, she is able to navigate the treacherous palace with ease. I thought that power could help me realize my dreams, but I almost lost myself in power.

 He Fengtian as Yuan Qi

The confidant of the grandson Zhu Zhanji, who is the same as Chen Wu, is trusted because he grew up with the grandson, but he is neglected in political affairs, so he is full of jealousy towards Chen Wu. He is especially good at flattering those around him. He is loyal to Zhu Zhanji, but also greedy for money and unscrupulous. He is a figure that everyone in the palace fears.

 Liu Min as Empress Zhang

Zhang's father, Zhang Qi, was the commander of Jingwei and a hero of the founding of the country. She is respectful, docile, smart and decisive, not only has the ability to recognize people and break things, but also is very brave and resourceful, and is deeply loved by Zhu Di and Xu. She has protected her husband and son in crisis many times. She is an outstanding female politician and a daughter-in-law that even Zhu Di has to respect.

Wang Yan as Meng Ziyun

Su Yuehua's biological mother, a top expert in cooking. He was expelled from the clan for refusing to rape and beating relatives, although he was exempted from punishment. The last one managed to suppress the famous chefs of Guanglu Temple and Shangshan Superintendent, and became the most noble food in the Ming Dynasty.

Supporting Cast 

 Wang Keru as Wu Miaoxian

Zhu Zhanji's concubine was Wu Cairen before Zhu Zhanji became emperor. After Zhu Zhanji became emperor, he was named Wu Zhaoyi. She looks innocent and lovely on the surface, but she is actually a scorpion-hearted person and has a place in the palace. She opposes Yao Zijin, and often goes to the Queen Mother to tell right and wrong, and sow discord between Yao Zijin and the concubines of various palaces. However, Zhu Zhanji was deceived and thought it was the hand of Queen Hu, but she was found out and demoted by Zhu Zhanji.

 Lian Lian as Wang Yaoqing

The palace chef, who was born with a mean mouth, always punished the little palace maid with the most severe means, and was the most feared hell teacher. In fact, she is well aware of the ruthlessness of court life, and has always used her own methods to carefully protect the group of little palace maids who have just entered the palace.

 Yu Rongguang as Zhu Di

The 60-year-old generation of heroes has created a prosperous and stable Yongle era. In his later years, he suspected that the prince was extremely fond of Shengsun, and occasionally had a childish side. Always fearful of death and tantrum, is actually a gourmet extreme lover of hidden attributes.

 Hong Jiantao as Zhu Gaochi

The elegant and gentle prince, with a personality like the soft moonlight, always scrutinized the Ming Dynasty's government, allowing the people to rest and recuperate, and was deeply respected and loved by all officials, but because he could not resist the temptation of delicious food, he was obese, and he was not good at riding. The Sacred Heart has been repeatedly ostracized by two brothers.

 Zhang Zhixi as Hu Shanwei

Daming Sishan, the eldest sister of Hu Shanxiang, helped the younger sister Hu Shanxiang to create auspiciousness and seized the position of the concubine for the Hu family. In order to pursue the coveted position of Shang Shi, you can never marry for life, and you can work hard to defeat all competitors at all costs.

 Wang Yu as Zhu Gaosui

Gentle and elegant, good at Danqing, the eldest prince has no plans for power and status on the surface. He sincerely assists the two brothers. In fact, he has the deepest ambition.

Production

Creative Team 
The behind-the-scenes team of the play continues to use the original cast of "Strategy of Yanxi Palace" and "The Sideburns Are Not Begonia Red", and a professional food production and filming team is specially invited, and will focus on presenting more than 600 kinds of Chinese food in the play. All of them show their ambition to create a fine costume food drama.

Shooting Process 
On October 15, 2020, the play started in Hengdian Film and Television City, Zhejiang. On February 5, 2021, the play was officially completed in Hengdian Film and Television City.

Production

Broadcast Information 
On February 19, 2022, the show released a group portrait version and announced that it was scheduled to be broadcast on February 22; on February 21, the play released an extra-long version of the movie; on February 22, the play was released The main visual poster of the red wall version, the single-player poster, and the emotional film of sweet and sadistic drama; on February 27, the play released a poster to celebrate the show’s 5-day broadcast volume breaking 400 million.

Soundtrack

Critical Reviews 
Although "Shangshi" has lost the flashy coat of "Shuang drama", and has lost the "I will pay back ten times if anyone commits a crime", it still follows the old way of fighting monsters and upgrading: one episode solves the emperor's dietary crisis; two The episode presented a secret recipe, which won the attention of the emperor's grandson; in the three episodes, he helped the sisters escape from danger, and cleverly cooked the prince's vegetarian food, which attracted Jin Yiwei's admiration. However, whether "Chinese cuisine + inspirational heroine" can pass the test depends on whether the follow-up plot and performance are stretched ("Wen Wei Po" review).

The female character setting in "Shangshi" deliberately broke the image of "female competition" in the past court dramas. It has to be said that in a certain sense, it is also to the audience's preference, showing the values ​​of women in the 20th century. The play is not careless in terms of historical textual research such as serving Hua Dao. Many netizens who are familiar with the history of the Ming Dynasty "picked" out that many details of the play follow historical records as much as possible. As an "ancient food show", the delicacies put on the table in each episode are also very moving. In the play, a "child-mother meeting" with steamed pigeons and pigeon eggs as the main materials is used to evoke Zhu Di's memory of the queen, so that he can remember the affectionate mother and son, and no longer challenge the prince. Highlights ("Wen Wei Po" review).

Awards and nominations

References 

2022 Chinese television series debuts
2022 web series debuts
2020s Chinese television series debuts
Chinese television series
Chinese drama television series
Chinese romance television series
Mandarin-language television shows
Chinese historical television series
Television series set in the Ming dynasty
Hunan Television dramas
Mango TV original programming